Simon Harcourt may refer to:

 Simon Harcourt (died 1577), MP for Staffordshire (UK Parliament constituency)
 Simon Harcourt, 1st Viscount Harcourt (c.1661–1727)
 Simon Harcourt, 1st Earl Harcourt (1714–1777)
 Simon Harcourt (1684–1720), British politician, MP for Abingdon
Simon Harcourt (1653–1724), British politician, MP for Aylesbury
Simon Harcourt (soldier) (1603–1642), Anglo-Irish soldier of fortune